Elizabeth A. Fiedler (born July 18, 1980) is an American politician who serves as a Democratic representative for the 184th district of the Pennsylvania House of Representatives.

Early life and career 
Fiedler was born on July 18, 1980, in Bloomsburg, Pennsylvania. Her parents were a middle school teacher and a high school teacher. Fiedler received a bachelor's degree in international relations at Bucknell University in 2002, and then worked at various restaurants in Philadelphia for six years. In 2008, she began working as a public radio reporter for WHYY, the NPR affiliate in Philadelphia. Fiedler was also President of the Board of Governors of the Pen & Pencil Club in 2014, a press club.

Pennsylvania House of Representatives 
Fiedler's campaign platform focused on Medicare for All, increased public education funding, and environmental regulations on oil and gas companies. She won the nomination with almost 51% of the vote in a 4-way race in the 2018 Democratic primary, and did not face a Republican challenger in the general election. Fiedler has been endorsed by numerous labor unions including the Philadelphia Federation of Teachers, AFSCME, UNITE HERE, Teamsters BMWED, PASNAP, various environmentalist groups, the Pennsylvania Working Families Party, and the Democratic Socialists of America.

Electoral history

See also
List of Democratic Socialists of America who have held office in the United States

References

External links
Official House website
Official campaign website

1980 births
21st-century American women politicians
21st-century American politicians
American radio reporters and correspondents
Bucknell University alumni
Living people
Democratic Socialists of America politicians from Pennsylvania
Democratic Party members of the Pennsylvania House of Representatives
NPR personalities
Pennsylvania political journalists
Pennsylvania socialists
Politicians from Philadelphia